

England
Head coach: Jack Rowell

 Garath Archer
 Martin Bayfield
 Kyran Bracken
 Jonathan Callard
 Will Carling (c)
 Mike Catt
 Ben Clarke
 Lawrence Dallaglio
 Graham Dawe
 Matt Dawson
 Phil de Glanville
 Paul Grayson
 Jeremy Guscott
 Martin Johnson
 Jason Leonard
 Steve Ojomoh
 Mark Regan
 Dean Richards
 Tim Rodber
 Graham Rowntree
 Jon Sleightholme
 Victor Ubogu
 Rory Underwood

France
Head coach: Jean-Claude Skrela

 Guy Accoceberry
 Abdelatif Benazzi
 Philippe Bernat-Salles
 Olivier Brouzet
 Laurent Cabannes
 Christian Califano
 Olivier Campan
 Philippe Carbonneau
 Thomas Castaignède
 Richard Castel
 Marc de Rougemont
 Sylvain Dispagne
 Richard Dourthe
 Fabien Galthié
 Stéphane Glas
 Jean-Michel Gonzales
 Raphaël Ibañez
 Thierry Lacroix
 Olivier Merle
 Émile Ntamack
 Fabien Pelous
 Alain Penaud
 Michel Perie
 Olivier Roumat
 Jean-Luc Sadourny
 Philippe Saint-André (c)
 Franck Tournaire

Ireland
Head coach: Murray Kidd

 Jonny Bell
 Paul Burke
 Allen Clarke
 Peter Clohessy
 David Corkery
 Victor Costello
 Jeremy Davidson
 Eric Elwood
 Maurice Field
 Neil Francis
 Gabriel Fulcher
 Simon Geoghegan
 Niall Hogan (c)**
 David Humphreys
 Henry Hurley
 Paddy Johns
 Terry Kingston
 Simon Mason
 Denis McBride
 Mark McCall
 Kurt McQuilkin
 Nick Popplewell
 Chris Saverimutto
 Jim Staples (c)*
 Paul Wallace
 Richard Wallace
 Niall Woods

*captain in the first two games

**captain the last two games

Scotland
Head coach: Jim Telfer

 Stewart Campbell
 Michael Dods
 Scott Hastings
 David Hilton
 Ian Jardine
 Craig Joiner
 Kenny Logan
 Kevin McKenzie
 Eric Peters
 Bryan Redpath
 Rowen Shepherd
 Ian Smith
 Gregor Townsend
 Rob Wainwright (c)
 Doddie Weir
 Peter Wright

Wales
Head coach: Kevin Bowring

 John D. Davies
 Leigh Davies
 Nigel Davies
 Ieuan Evans
 Rob Howley
 Jonathan Humphreys (c)
 Garin Jenkins
 Neil Jenkins
 Derwyn Jones
 Gwyn Jones
 Andrew Lewis
 Emyr Lewis
 Gareth Llewellyn
 Christian Loader
 Wayne Proctor
 Hemi Taylor
 Arwel Thomas
 Gareth Thomas
 Justin Thomas
 Steve Williams

External links

Six Nations Championship squads